Mor Efraim (or Effraim, ; born 18 January 1988) is an Israeli footballer who plays as a midfielder and has appeared for the Israel women's national team.

Career
Efraim has been capped for the Israel national team, appearing for the team during the UEFA Women's Euro 2021 qualifying cycle.

International goals

References

External links
 
 
 

1988 births
Living people
Footballers from Southern District (Israel)
Israeli women's footballers
Women's association football midfielders
Israel women's international footballers
Jewish Israeli sportspeople
Jewish footballers
Jewish sportswomen
Israeli people of Ethiopian-Jewish descent
Sportspeople of Ethiopian descent